The Hockey East Rookie of the Year is an annual award given out at the conclusion of the Hockey East regular season to the best player in the conference as voted by the coaches of each Hockey East team.

The Rookie of the Year was first awarded in 1985 and every year thereafter.

The award has been shared four times, in 1985–86, 1988–89, 1991–92, and most recently in 2020–21. Three players have been both the Player and Rookie-of-the-Year in the same season (Brian Leetch, Paul Kariya, and Jack Eichel). (as of 2022)

Award winners

Winners by school

Winners by position

See also
Hockey East Awards

References

General

Specific

External links
Hockey East Awards (Incomplete)

College ice hockey trophies and awards in the United States